The 8th Sabor was inaugurated on 28 December 2015 (for the first time in history due to a postponed election of the Speaker), having originally been called by the President to hold an inaugural session on December 3. The assembly came into existence following the November 2015 parliamentary election and consisted of 151 representatives elected from 10 geographical and two special electoral districts. The 8th Sabor dissolved itself by a vote of 137 in favor on 20 June 2016 and formally dissolved on 15 July 2016. The 8th Sabor was the shortest in the history of independent Croatia with a term lasting only 200 days. The 8th Sabor officially ended on 14 October with the inauguration of the 9th Sabor.

Parliamentary officials

The Speaker of the Croatian Parliament (or President) from 28 December 2015 is Željko Reiner, member of the Croatian Democratic Union (HDZ).

Vice presidents of Sabor are Ante Sanader (HDZ), Robert Podolnjak (Most) and Ivan Tepeš (HSP AS). Two vice presidents were elected on 3 February 2016: Milanka Opačić (SDP) and Vesna Pusić (HNS).

Composition
On the basis of the parliamentary election of 2015, the composition of the Sabor as of the dissolution is as follows. There has to be noted that national minority MPs can join other clubs as well beside the national minority group.

By parliamentary club

By political party

MPs by party

Changes 

Note that a number of MPs who are high-ranking members of parties in the ruling coalition were subsequently appointed to various ministerial and governmental positions, while others continued to serve as city mayors. In such cases they are required by Croatian law to put their parliamentary mandate on hold for the duration of their other term of office and in the meantime their seats are then taken by a party-appointed replacement MP. Those replacements are documented above. The changes which resulted in club changes or occurred after the inauguration of the new government are shown here as well.

References

Lists of representatives in the modern Croatian Parliament by term
2010s in Croatia